Torrumbarry  is a town in northern Victoria, Australia. The town was once large but shrunk over time. The town still houses a hotel, a hall, a general store and a post office.

Weir
The town is home to an important weir situated on the Murray River, a few kilometres north of the township. The weir was built in the 1920s. It operated efficiently until 1992 when it was damaged extensively. After numerous unsuccessful repairs, it was decided the weir would be rebuilt with a new design that was completed during 1996. An information centre was built outlining the importance and history of the weir. A post office was built at the weir in 1919 but closed 5 years later due to the fact it was rarely used.

Gallery

References

External links

Campaspe Shire Suburb profile

Towns in Victoria (Australia)
Populated places on the Murray River